Acragas castaneiceps is a species of jumping spider in the genus Acragas. The scientific name of this species was first published in 1900 by Simon. These spiders are found in Brazil.

References

External links 

castaneiceps
Spiders described in 1900
Endemic fauna of Brazil
Spiders of Brazil